Eric Natanael Backman (18 May 1896 – 29 June 1965) was a Swedish long distance runner who had his best achievements at the 1920 Summer Olympics. He won the silver medal in the 8,000 m cross-country race, 2.6 seconds behind the legendary Paavo Nurmi. This second place helped the Swedish cross-country team to win the bronze medal behind Finland and Great Britain, as two other team members finished 10th and 11th. This scenario repeated in the 3,000 m event – Backman finished second and other Swedes 10th and 12th; this time Backman did not receive an individual medal, but he again pulled up the Swedish team to the third place. In the 5,000 metres Backman finished third, again behind Paavo Nurmi.

Backman was a heavy smoker and enjoyed alcohol, yet he was an eight-time Swedish champion in the 5,000 m and 10,000 m in 1918–23, and held Swedish records over 5,000 m, 10,000 m, 5 miles and one-hour run. After 1943 he worked in the Volvo factory in Skövde.

References

1896 births
1965 deaths
People from Tidaholm Municipality
Swedish male long-distance runners
Olympic silver medalists for Sweden
Olympic bronze medalists for Sweden
Athletes (track and field) at the 1920 Summer Olympics
Olympic athletes of Sweden
Medalists at the 1920 Summer Olympics
Olympic silver medalists in athletics (track and field)
Olympic bronze medalists in athletics (track and field)
Olympic cross country runners
Sportspeople from Västra Götaland County